Hudson Riley Hawk (born December 6, 1992) is an American professional skateboarder. 

He is the son of Tony Hawk. Unlike his father, who is known for his vert style, Riley is better known as a street skater. He turned pro on his 21st birthday in December 2013 and became Skateboarder Magazine'''s 2013 Amateur of the Year on the same day. He is sponsored by Baker and Lakai.

He won “Year’s Best Am” for The Skateboard Mag in December 2013. 

Hawk is featured in the Tony Hawk's video game series, appearing in Tony Hawk's Pro Skater HD, Tony Hawk's Pro Skater 5 and Tony Hawk's Pro Skater 1 + 2''.

Hawk is also the frontman of the punk band Warish.

Since early 2021, Hawk has been in a relationship with Frances Bean Cobain, daughter of late Nirvana frontman Kurt Cobain and Hole frontwoman Courtney Love.

References 

American skateboarders
Living people
1992 births
X Games athletes
Place of birth missing (living people)